Donald McDonnell (5 November 1933 – 11 March 2021) was an Australian boxer. He competed in the men's featherweight event at the 1952 Summer Olympics.

References

External links

1933 births
2021 deaths
Australian male boxers
Olympic boxers of Australia
Boxers at the 1952 Summer Olympics
Boxers from Sydney
Featherweight boxers